The Clewiston Historic Schools are two historic schools in Clewiston, Florida. They are located at 325 East Circle Drive and 475 East Osceola Avenue. On September 26, 1997, they were added to the U.S. National Register of Historic Places.

References

External links

 Hendry County listings at National Register of Historic Places
 Hendry County listings at Florida's Office of Cultural and Historical Programs

Buildings and structures in Hendry County, Florida
School buildings on the National Register of Historic Places in Florida
National Register of Historic Places in Hendry County, Florida